A fruit stand is a primarily open-air business venue that sells seasonal fruit and many fruit products from local growers. It might also sell vegetables and various processed items derived from fruit.  The fruit stand is a small business structure that is primarily run as an independent sole proprietorship, with very few franchises or branches of larger fruit stand conglomerates, though many large food industry businesses have developed from fruit stand businesses.

The fruit stand has been a neighborhood hub for many generations and is one of the few enterprises that is important to every culture and readily available on every continent. Fruit stands still comprise a primary distribution system for the fresh produce consumed by millions in developing countries.

History 

In the most traditional food distribution model, farmers and growers sell foodstuffs directly to consumers. A simple stand located adjacent to an established road/transportation route is the most familiar model. Fruit and produce stands are often seasonal, harvest-based operations. In the U.S., some fruit stands have grown into famous grocery store chains. Started as a fruit stand in 1948, the Dorothy Lane Market (DLM) company is now a chain of specialty grocery stores. Sprouts, LLC, with over $2.5 million actual sales in 2013, claims to share a similar history.

According to the History Channel, Dole Foods began as a roadside pineapple stand in Hawaii. In 2010, the food industry conglomerate had revenues over $6.9 billion from operations in more than 90 companies.

The past half-century has seen increasing agricultural mechanization, genome-based crop yield modifications, widespread chemical pesticide use, markets influences by subsidies and tariffs and increased household spending capacity. Agribusiness has been the natural business model in this context.

Many but not all people now have a broader range of produce and other foods to choose from in their grocery stores, often at lower cost.

A century and a half of food safety regulation 

The U.S. Department of Agriculture was created in the 1860s. By the 1890s, the USDA was beginning to become involved in livestock inspections. In 1905, the U.S. government had a call to action when Upton Sinclair polemic against unsanitary working conditions at the expansive Chicago stockyards was published as a magazine serial. This became a national issue in part because the millions of animals were slaughtered and processed each year were distributed via rail to markets all across the nation. Initially a socialist's demand for better conditions for labor, ‘The Jungle’ was a catalyst for food industry regulation.

The U.S. Food and Drug Administration is the federal agency tasked with food safety regulation. States also pass laws regulating food industry issues. From the FDA website:

Retail Food Protection--A Cooperative Program

More than 3,000 state, local and tribal agencies have primary responsibility to regulate the retail food and foodservice industries in the United States. They are responsible for the inspection and oversight of over 1 million food establishments – restaurants and grocery stores, as well as vending machines, cafeterias, and other outlets in health-care facilities, schools, and correctional facilities.

FDA strives to promote the application of science-based food safety principles in retail and foodservice settings to minimize the incidence of foodborne illness. FDA assists regulatory agencies and the industries they regulate by providing a model Food Code, scientifically-based guidance, training, program evaluation, and technical assistance.

U.S. citizens continue to have a high level of expectation for food safety controls by the government.

California case study: licenses might be needed for fruit stand operations 

In 2008, two little girls in Clayton, California, were forced to shut down their fruit stand. The mayor decided it was a commercial enterprise being run in an area that was not zoned for commerce.

“They may start out with a little card-table and selling a couple of things, but then who is to say what else they have. Is all the produce made there, do they grow it themselves? Are they going to have eggs and chickens for sale next,” said Clayton Mayor Gregg Manning. The mayor later called the girls and their father “self-centered.”

As this topic is being researched, Gregg Manning is no longer the Mayor of Clayton, California.

2009 California Assembly Bill 2168 for new farm stand regulations expands options 

AB 2168 establishes a new category for farm stands that are allowed to sell processed agricultural products, such as jams, preserves, pickles, juices, cured olives and other “value-added” products made with ingredients produced on or near the farm, in addition to fresh produce and eggs produced on the farm.

Local-processed farm products sold at farm stands must all be:

 Shelf-stable, specifically “non-potentially hazardous.” This generally means food products that can be safely held without temperature controls because the product would not support the rapid growth of infectious or toxic organisms.
 Prepared and packaged in a health department-approved facility, not a home kitchen. For low-acid canned goods with pH levels greater than 4.6, such as preserved corn or green beans, processing must take place in a state-licensed cannery. For products such as salsas or chutneys where acid levels are unknown, the state offers free testing.
 Produced in “close proximity” to the farm stand.
 One advantage of selling value-added products is growers can create jams or juices from produce that might not otherwise be sold because of cosmetic blemishes, seasonal market saturation, or overproduction. Converting excess fruits or vegetables into a product that can be sold in the off-season is one more chance for income. Having products to sell year-round can also mean more regular customers.

New York City regulations 

LICENSE DESCRIPTION:
A business must have a Stoop Line Stand license if fruits, vegetables, soft drinks, flowers, confectionery, cigars, cigarettes, tobacco, or ice cream are sold from a stand outside of and directly adjacent to an existing retail establishment.

Public policy research

Harvard Law School  

Harvard Law School established their Food Law and Policy Clinic of the Center for Health Law and Policy Innovation in 2010 to address growing concerns about the health, environmental, and economic consequences of the laws and policies that structure the U.S. food system.

Their 2012 report titled ‘Good Laws, Good Food: Putting State Food Policy to Work for our Communities’ was a collaboration with Mark Winne, respected food distribution expert, food industry activist and author of ‘Closing the Food Gap.’ Winne's term ‘food desert’ characterizes areas, usually urban, which do not have a local supermarket. This situation, according to Winne and others, underpins a kaleidoscope of social and economic challenges for neighborhood residents.

The HLS report (available in a searchable pdf format) addresses food retail outlets including fruit stands and other non-permanent distribution points.

California 

California, the top agricultural producer of all the States, hosts agribusiness interests as well as many strong organizations which advocate for reform of food distribution regulations in the interest of providing greater quantities of healthier, less expensive, efficiently/locally produced fresh foods to consumers.

Change Lab Solutions 

Change Lab Solutions is a nonprofit which offers legal information on public health issues. The website states:

‘It can be difficult—if not impossible—to find fresh, affordable healthy food in many urban and rural low-income communities. One way to make fresh produce more accessible is to encourage alternative retail outlets, such as farmers’ markets, farm stands, and community supported agriculture (CSA) programs, where farmers can sell their produce directly to consumers.’

Their report entitled ‘California Certified Farmers’ Markets and Farm Stands: A Closer Look at State Law’ argues for more flexible regulations. Change Lab Solutions has written a fact sheet entitled ‘Creating a Permit Program for Produce Cart Vendors.’

University of California at Davis 

The University of California at Davis maintains a Small Farm Program which provides information about California Assembly Bill 2168 (2009). This legislation ‘created more allowances for modern farm stands throughout California.'

Fruit stand policy on the East Coast 

In 2012, Durham, North Carolina initiated the ‘Durham Network of Agriculture’ to connect farmer, educators and urban agriculturalists and identify new ways to address ‘food desert’ conditions. Particular focus was placed on encouraging urban farms and selling locally-grown produce, which was previously illegal.

State of New Jersey 

The State of New Jersey official website states:
 
Seasonal markets sprout up in nearly every county as far north as Sussex to down at the southern shore in Cape May County.  Leaders and business people in the community have recognized that smart consumers want to improve their diets through purchasing fresh produce. However, these markets go beyond, by providing economic viability and enhancing the quality of life in each community that creates this farm fresh experience.

Rutgers University conducts a ‘Youth Farmstands’ program for students who are 11-17 years old, available one-three 2-3 hour work shifts/week, prepared to do hard, physical work outside in all types of weather...and ‘ready and excited to learn.’ A video link <https://www.youtube.com/watch?v=zEUaqociqeU> from the program website depicts some of the student participants selling fruit and other produce at an urban farm stand.

In popular culture

In film 

Urban fruit stands are often used in filmmaking and television productions to add to the sense of community of the area depicted, particularly with regard to ethnic neighborhoods in New York City.

They are significant in two scenes from The Godfather. In Part II, young Corleone's growing respect in the neighborhood is shown partially by a fruit stand's owner's refusal to accept payment from Vito for his purchase. In the first film, Vito is shot down at a fruit stand while buying oranges, harbingers of doom in all three films.

Sidewalk fruit stands have become somewhat of a cliché in action films, as cars frequently crash into them during chases.  Examples of these films include:

Raiders of the Lost Ark (1981) feature a chase scene at the market in Cairo involving fruit stands.

In Police Academy 6: City Under Siege, Captain Harris and Lt. Proctor commandeer a bus and go chasing after the Mastermind.  The bus just manages to avoid hitting a fruit stand.

The cast of Jackass: The Movie go flying into a fruit stand at the end of the opening credits.

In Ronin, the fruit stand is crashed into during a car chase and the fruit vendor is then shot.

In The Matrix, Agent Smith shoots the melons in a fruit stand while pursuing Neo through a crowded market in the Matrix.

The Rock crashed through a fruit stand hilariously during the car chase through San Francisco.

In The Mummy, some fruit and vegetable stands are knocked over when Rick is driving through Cairo to escape the Imhotep.

In 2010's The Tourist, Johnny Depp's character's escape from the bad guys on foot, this involves dropping into an open-air market from above, taking out a fruit stand in the process.

In TV 

American Fruit Stand Season 36 Episode on Sesame Street:
Alan is busy receiving a big delivery at Hooper's Store so Miles helps him out by watching the fruit stand.  Elmo and Zoe walk by talking about cookies and ice cream.  All of a sudden, Sesame Street is transformed into a 1950s musical show “American Fruit Stand”.  Miles sings “I Love Fruit” (to the tune of “I Feel Good”), a song about how fruit tastes and how good it is for the body.  Elmo and Zoe get so excited about fruit that they now want an apple and an orange.  Gina comes to the fruit stand and asks Miles for some peaches and pears.  Sesame Street is transformed once again and Miles sings, “Peaches and Pears” (to the tune of “Twist and Shout”).

References 

Food retailing
Food markets
Retailers by type of merchandise sold